The Manor House, Bishop Bridge is located in Lincolnshire, England. 

The house was built circa 1849, named "Kingerby Vale Cottage" on the Deeds, originally being two farm cottages which were later converted into one main dwelling and extended upon.  In 2005, the manor was purchased by Sir John Hackett together with his Wife Lady Valentina Hackett and was sold again following extensive Flooding in 2008, it was then renamed to "Maja" just prior to its sale in 2010.

In 1964, the property was sold by a 'trust' made up of Michael Francis Young of Kingerby Hall, Geoffrey Mawer Cooper, Sir James William Francis Hill, a leading historian of Lincoln and Lincolnshire, and Gerrard Hugh Camamile of Newland Chambers. and in 1973 the manor house was purchased from Edward Squires of the 'Crown Inn' by Basil Allen-Mills, a retired Major in the British Army. By 1984, it was in the ownership of Michael Berridge, Public Relation Officer of the Central Council for British Naturism.

Bishopbridge Manor still retains many original internal features.

References

Houses in Lincolnshire